Oscar Periche (born 31 October 1949) is a Cuban water polo player. He competed at the 1968, 1972, 1976 and the 1980 Summer Olympics.

See also
 List of players who have appeared in multiple men's Olympic water polo tournaments
 List of men's Olympic water polo tournament goalkeepers

References

1949 births
Living people
Cuban male water polo players
Water polo goalkeepers
Olympic water polo players of Cuba
Water polo players at the 1968 Summer Olympics
Water polo players at the 1972 Summer Olympics
Water polo players at the 1976 Summer Olympics
Water polo players at the 1980 Summer Olympics